Damhi Marai ( Damhi is the separate village from the Marai village and both are under same village development committee ) is a village development committee in Mahottari District in the Janakpur Zone of south-eastern Nepal. At the time of the 1991 Nepal census it had a population of 7734 people living in 1401 individual households.

References

External links
UN map of the municipalities of Mahottari District

Populated places in Mahottari District